Nemadus is a genus of small carrion beetles in the family Leiodidae.

Selected Species
 Nemadus brachyderus (LeConte, 1863)
 Nemadus browni Peck and Cook, 2007
 Nemadus colonoides (Kraatz, 1851)
 Nemadus criddlei Peck and Cook, 2007
 Nemadus falli Peck and Cook, 2007
 Nemadus gracilicornis Fall, 1937
 Nemadus hornii Hatch, 1933
 Nemadus integer Fall, 1937
 Nemadus myrmecophilus Jeannel, 1936
 Nemadus parasitus (LeConte, 1853)
 Nemadus pusio (LeConte, 1859)
 Nemadus tenuitarsis Jeannel, 1936
 Nemadus triangulum Jeannel, 1936

References

 Peck, Stewart B. / Arnett, Ross H. Jr. and Michael C. Thomas, eds. (2001). "Family 19. Leiodidae Fleming, 1821". American Beetles, vol. 1: Archostemata, Myxophaga, Adephaga, Polyphaga: Staphyliniformia, 250–258.
 Peck, Stewart B., and Joyce Cook (2007). "Systematics, distributions, and bionomics of the Neoeocatops gen. nov. and Nemadus of North America (Coleoptera: Leiodidae: Cholevinae: Anemadini)". The Canadian Entomologist, vol. 139, no. 1, 87–117.

Further reading

 NCBI Taxonomy Browser, Nemadus

 
Leiodidae